Origen Drew Richardson (July 20, 1795 – November 29, 1876) was an American lawyer and politician in the U.S. state of Michigan and in the Nebraska Territory. He served in the Michigan House of Representatives and was the fourth lieutenant governor of Michigan.

Biography
Richardson was born in Woodstock, Vermont, the son of Mason Richardson and Mary (Powers) Richardson. He studied and practiced law in Woodstock. While a student in the law offices of a relative, Israel Putnam Richardson (the father of Civil War General Israel Bush Richardson), Origen joined the Army and participated in the Battle of Plattsburgh during the War of 1812. He remained in Vermont and practiced law until 1826, when he moved to Pontiac, Michigan. He was admitted to the bar of Oakland County in July 1826 and began a law practice. In 1830, he was a part of a three-member commission appointed to locate a seat of government for Saginaw County, which at the time was not yet organized.

Michigan politics
He was a member of the first convention of assent held in Ann Arbor in September 1836 that rejected the conditions placed by the U.S. Congress on the admission of Michigan as a State of the Union (see the Frostbitten Convention and the end of the Toledo War). From 1830 to 1836, he was the Oakland County prosecutor and served as a member of the Michigan House of Representatives in the first legislature, which convened at Detroit in November 1835 and of the sixth legislature, which convened in Detroit in January 1841.

In 1841, he was elected the fourth Lieutenant Governor of Michigan and was re-elected in 1843, serving during the first four years of Governor John S. Barry's governorship. He continued the practice of law in Pontiac until 1854.

Nebraska Territory politics
In the fall of 1854, he moved to Omaha, Nebraska, which was had been organized as the Nebraska Territory in May of that year. He served as a member of the Legislative Council in the first and second sessions of the Territorial Nebraska Legislature. He took a prominent part in framing the laws of Nebraska and was one of the three commissioners to codify those laws.

Family life
Richardson and his wife Sarah P. (Hill) Richardson had two children, Lyman Richardson and Cornelia Richardson. Although Richardson nominally resided in Nebraska, his wife and family remained in Pontiac until moving there in 1874. He died only two years later of apoplexy. His wife died three days afterwards. Both were buried in Prospect Hill Cemetery in Omaha.

References

External links
 

The Nebraska Blue Book Online Members of Nebraska Territorial Legislature, 1855–1867. p. 333. 47th edition, 2004–2005.

1795 births
1876 deaths
Lieutenant Governors of Michigan
Democratic Party members of the Michigan House of Representatives
Members of the Nebraska Territorial Legislature
People from Woodstock, Vermont
Politicians from Omaha, Nebraska
Michigan lawyers
Burials at Prospect Hill Cemetery (North Omaha, Nebraska)
Nebraska Democrats
Lawyers from Omaha, Nebraska
Nebraska lawyers
19th-century American politicians
19th-century American lawyers